La Sainte Union Catholic School is a girls' Roman Catholic secondary school based in Highgate in North London.

History
Formerly, a grant-maintained school, La Sainte Union Catholic School is now a voluntary-aided school which teaches girls aged 11–18. It is a Specialist Science College. It was awarded Beacon school status in 1999.
The school is a part of the LaSWAP Sixth Form consortium, together with William Ellis School, Acland Burghley School and Parliament Hill School. As such, although the main student body is female, the school has a mixed sixth-form.

The school is named after the order of sisters that founded and continues to run the school, the Sisters of La Sainte Union des Sacrés-Coeurs (also known as the Holy Union Sisters). This teaching order was founded in 1826 by Father Jean-Baptiste Debrabant, a Belgian priest who felt that the future of the Catholic Church lay in the hands of the young women who would eventually bring up future generations of the faithful, declaring that "a Christian-based education offers sure hope for the future of religion and society".

The school site is on Highgate Road/Croftdown Road, opposite Parliament Hill Fields. It was originally a small private boarding school, becoming a [comprehensive school] in 1966, following its amalgamation with Our Lady of Sion Girls' Grammar School which closed its school in Eden Grove, Holloway and moved to the Highgate site. During the 1990s the school had grant-maintained status. It was one of the first schools in London to be named as a Beacon school in a government scheme designed to recognize outstanding achievement in inner-city schools. The school in 2004 been awarded specialist school (science ) status., and High Performing Specialist School status in 2008.

The school was recognised as a good school by Ofsted in 2010, and confirmed as such in a Section 8 inspection in 2019.

LaSWAP Sixth Form
The LaSWAP Sixth Form is the sixth form consortium of four North London schools: Acland Burghley School, La Sainte Union Catholic School, Parliament Hill School and William Ellis School. It is one of the largest sixth form consortia in the Greater London area offering some 42 different AS and A2 courses, AGCEs, BTECs, NVQs and GCSE courses. The name was formed from the first three letters of La Sainte Union and the first letter of the other three schools.

Media

La Sainte Union has been featured in The Westminster Extra, The Camden New Journal and The Ham&High multiple times for their school plays and acting opportunities.

The school was mentioned in the Guardian, in October 2020 after 13 girls were hospitalised after sharing some sweets.

Notable former pupils
Kathleen Mary Cook, mechanical engineer
Maggie Aderin-Pocock MBE, British space scientist
Tulisa Contostavlos, musician, N-Dubz, attended the school during her early secondary years
Imelda Staunton, actress, 'Vera Drake', and 'Harry Potter and The Order of The Phoenix

Sister schools
St Catherine's Catholic School for Girls England
St. Anne's Catholic School (Southampton) England
Grays Convent High School England
La Sainte Union Convent School England
La Sainte Union College of Higher Education England
Banagher College Ireland
Our Lady's Bower School Ireland
Debrabant School Tanzania

External links 
 La Sainte Union Catholic School
 LaSWAP sixth form consortium

References

Secondary schools in the London Borough of Camden
Girls' schools in London
Catholic secondary schools in the Archdiocese of Westminster
Voluntary aided schools in London
Highgate